MET Institute of Management is a private business school in Mumbai, India. The school was founded in the year 1989 and is located in the Mumbai suburb of Bandra. It is associated with the University of Mumbai and is AICTE ISO 9001:2015 certified.

Programmes
MET Institute of Management offers the following programmes:

Master of Management Studies (MMS)
MET Institute of Management offers Master of Management Studies (MMS): which is a two years full-time Post-Graduate programme affiliated to University of Mumbai and Approved by the Directorate of Technical Education & All India Council for Technical Education.
Specializations include:
 Finance
 Marketing
 Human Resources
 Operations
 Systems/Information Technology

Part Time Masters Degree
Part Time master's degree offered at MET Institute of Management is a three-year, part-time Post Graduate programme affiliated to University of Mumbai.
 Finance
 Marketing
 Human Resource Development
 Operations
 Information Systems

PhD in Management
PhD in Management is a post-master's programme affiliated to the University of Mumbai.

Rankings
Ranked 5th Best B School in Mumbai and 28th Best Pvt. B School All India by the Times B School Survey 2019

References

External links
 Official Site

University of Mumbai
Business schools in Mumbai
1989 establishments in Maharashtra